The Territorial Force Nursing Service (TFNS) was established in 1908, part of the reform of the British auxiliary forces introduced by Richard Haldane which created the Territorial Force. Nurses with at least three years of training were able to volunteer for the service, and facilities comprised 23 large buildings earmarked for use as hospitals in the event of war. The TFNS was augmented by the affiliation of Voluntary Aid Detachments. On the outbreak of the First World War, the hospitals were commissioned and up to 2,784 nurses mobilised to staff them. By the end of the war, up to 8,140 nurses had served with the TFNS, 2,280 of them in hospitals and casualty clearing stations abroad. After the war, the TFNS became the Territorial Army Nursing Service in line with the reconstitution of the Territorial Force as the Territorial Army.

Formation
The Territorial Force Nursing Service (TFNS) was established by Richard Haldane as part of the Territorial Force, created by his reform of auxiliary forces in the United Kingdom (UK). The service was inaugurated in July 1908, and its first Matron-in-Chief was Sidney Browne, who had previously held this position in the Queen Alexandra’s Imperial Military Nursing Service (QAIMNS). Later on, according to The British Journal of Nursing the principal matron was Euphemia Steele Innes, who was a board member of Queen Alexandra's Army Nursing Board. Twenty-three large buildings, such as schools, colleges, hotels and public buildings, were earmarked across the country for use as territorial hospitals, though they retained their civilian usage in peacetime and would only become operational in the event of war.

TFNS nurses had to be 23 years of age or older and must have completed at least three years of training in a recognised hospital. They received neither pay nor special training during peacetime, though matrons underwent seven days of training in a military hospital bi-annually. By March 1909, enough nurses for 15 hospitals in England and Scotland had volunteered. Opposition from the Army Nursing Board, Sydney Holland (Chairman of the London Hospital) and senior London nurses delayed the establishment of the TFNS in the capital until the middle of March. On the 15th, 400 nurses were recruited as a result of a public meeting attended by many well-known speakers, including Elizabeth Haldane (vice-chairwoman of the Territorial Nursing Council and sister of Richard), Isla Stewart (Matron at St Bartholomew's Hospital) and Sir Alfred Keogh (Director General Army Medical Services). This was enough to establish two hospitals: No.1 (City of London) General Hospital, to be staffed exclusively by nurses from St Bartholomew's Hospital; and No.2 (City of London) General Hospital, to be staffed by nurses from the London Hospital and Guy's Hospital. Also in 1909, the TFNS was augmented by the affiliation of the Red Cross-organised Voluntary Aid Detachments (VADs). By January 1911, some 3,000 nurses had enrolled in the TFNS, and the next year the VADs numbered some 26,000 members. In 1913, TFNS nurses were given permission to volunteer for overseas service.

First World War
On the outbreak of the First World War in August 1914, the hospitals were commissioned and the TFNS mobilised. By the end of the month, 19 territorial hospitals were operational and between 2,117 and 2,784 TFNS nurses had been mobilised to staff them. The remaining four hospitals became operational the next month, and another two were opened in 1915 and 1917. Some territorial hospitals could be quite considerable, such as Manchester's 6,700-bed Second Western General Hospital. There were also hundreds of smaller auxiliary hospitals, used initially for surgery and later as convalescent facilities. Eighteen territorial hospitals were established overseas, and TFNS nurses also worked alongside QAIMNS nurses in military hospitals and casualty clearing stations in France, Belgium, Malta, Salonica, Gibraltar, Egypt, Mesopotamia and East Africa. In total, between 7,117 and 8,140 nurses served in the TFNS during the war, of which 2,280 served overseas.

One such nurse was Grace Mitchell, who had been called up shortly after the start of the war. She worked initially in the 3rd Southern General Hospital in Oxford, and in May 1917 transferred to Unit 56 General Hospital in Étaples, France. This was a Base Hospital, part of the casualty evacuation chain, located further back from the front lines than the casualty clearing stations. The hospitals were located close to the coast, with good rail access to facilitate the transport and repatriation of casualties. From September 1918, she worked at several casualty clearing stations in France, Belgium and Germany, and was demobilised in May 1920.

Military nurses were traditionally required to be unmarried or widowed with no dependents, but the shortage of nurses during the war meant that married women were allowed into the service and single nurses who married were allowed to remain. Following the war, most nurses returned to civilian work, and all married nurses were forced to resign from the TFNS. In line with the reconstitution of the Territorial Force as the Territorial Army, the TFNS became the Territorial Army Nursing Service in 1921.

References

Bibliography
 
 
 
 

Army Reserve (United Kingdom)
Military units and formations established in 1908
British military nurses